Morais Guy is a Jamaican politician from the People's National Party. He is member of the Shadow Cabinet of Jamaica, and is Shadow Minister for Health.

References 

Living people
21st-century Jamaican politicians
People from Saint Mary Parish, Jamaica
Members of the House of Representatives of Jamaica
People's National Party (Jamaica) politicians
Year of birth missing (living people)
Members of the 14th Parliament of Jamaica